The karate competition at the World Games 2009 took place from July 25 to July 26, at the National Sun Yat-Sen University Gymnasium in Kaohsiung, Taiwan.

Men's events

Women's events

External links
 Competition schedule
 Sports 123
 Results

 
2009
2009 World Games
2009 in karate